Paul Feltham (born 1 October 1948) is a sport psychologist and former Australian rules footballer and coach. He is best known for a short stint as caretaker senior coach of the Brisbane Bears in 1989.

Playing career 
Early in his career, Feltham played for Box Hill in the VFA in 1967, Eastlake Football Club in the ACTAFL and Balmain Football Club in the NSWAFL. His talent was his tough, courageous determination and his quick handball. Feltham played as a winger and midfielder North Melbourne from 1970 to 1976. He played in the 1974 VFL Grand Final and was one of the best players in North Melbourne Football Club's first Premiership in 1975. He later joined Richmond in 1978, but his best football games were played at North Melbourne Football club during the '70s.

Coaching career

Early career
Feltham captain-coached Mordialloc in 1979, then left to coach West Canberra in 1980.

Later in the 1980s he moved to Queensland, where he coached the University of Southern Queensland's Australian football team to back to back premierships in the Darling Downs AFL competition in 1986 and 1987 and the Morningside Football Club (QAFL),

Brisbane Bears
Feltham joined the underperforming Brisbane Bears in a part-time role as sports psychologist for the 1989 season.

When incumbent senior coach Peter Knights was sacked with seven games remaining in the 1989 season, Feltham was surprisingly appointed caretaker senior coach ahead of any of the existing coaching panel. The Bears immediately rallied to win five of the remaining matches, which included an upset win over the eventual premiers Hawthorn, who only lost three matches over the home and away season.

Feltham was not considered for the permanent senior coaching position for the following season, reportedly due to a clash with particular senior players and certain club personnel, most notably football manager Shane O'Sullivan.  He was replaced by another caretaker senior coach, former coaching assistant and ex-Fitzroy player Norm Dare, for the 1990 season while the search for a permanent senior coach continued for 1991.

Other coaching roles
For most of the 1990s, he disappeared from the spotlight, but reappeared in 1999 as an applicant for the vacant coaching role with Woodville-West Torrens. He applied for the same position again the following season. He also applied for the coaching role with Hawthorn in 2004. He was unsuccessful in each of these applications.

He is currently based in Canada, where he is coach of the London Magpies Australian Football Club, and is also a sports psychologist with AFL Canada's national side, the Northwind.

References

External links

1948 births
Living people
North Melbourne Football Club players
North Melbourne Football Club Premiership players
Richmond Football Club players
Brisbane Bears coaches
Australian rules footballers from the Australian Capital Territory
Eastlake Football Club players
Balmain Australian Football Club players
Australian psychologists
Mordialloc Football Club players
Mordialloc Football Club coaches
One-time VFL/AFL Premiership players